Bogdan Iosif Cistean (born 29 December 1986) is a Romanian former football player and current Norfolk based football coach.

References

External links
 

1986 births
Living people
People from Blaj
Romanian footballers
Association football defenders
Liga I players
FC Sportul Studențesc București players
Liga II players
FC Bihor Oradea players
FC Brașov (1936) players
FC Progresul București players
FC Steaua II București players